Hanover Crossing is a retail area under redevelopment, with Macy's as the only anchor remaining open.

It is located on the site of the Hanover Mall, which was a one-story, enclosed shopping mall and soon to be a combined open-air retail, entertainment and lifestyle space and residential development in Hanover, Massachusetts. It had 80 shops and restaurants. The mall closed in January 2020 for redevelopment. Previous anchors include A.C. Moore, Almy's, Ames, Filene's, JCPenney, Jordan Marsh, Old Navy, Sears, Walmart, Woolworth, and Zayre.

The site is located off exit 32 (previously exit 13) of Route 3 in Hanover, Massachusetts.

History
Hanover Mall was built in 1971 and renovated in 1999. Originally the mall anchors were Woolworth, Zayre and Almy's. Sears was later added to the mall. Almy's closed in 1987 and its space was filled by Filene's. Zayre became Ames after the chains merged in 1989. Jordan Marsh closed in 1996 shortly after it became Macy's and was then torn down to become a new wing which housed JCPenney. Filene's was expanded about this time. Old Navy replaced the food court which had not seen enough business to remain. In 2002, Ames closed and the space became Walmart in Fall 2004. In January 2015, it was announced the JCPenney store was closing as part of a plan to close 39 underperforming stores nationwide. After being vacant for nearly two years, the defunct JCPenney store has since been converted into the Hanover Mall Event Center, and is currently the venue for the SouthCoast Comic Con fan convention. On September 5, 2019, it was announced that Sears would also be closing on December 15, 2019. On October 5, 2019, it was announced that Walmart would be closing as well on October 25, 2019, as well as Old Navy, which left Macy's as the only anchor left. 

A new outdoor shopping center called Hanover Crossing which opened in 2022, would replace the mall which closed in January 2020 and was torn down in April 2020. As part of the project, a new Market Basket opened in the northern part of the construction area on March 11, 2022.

References

External links
official website 

CBL Properties
Shopping malls in Massachusetts
Hanover Mall
Buildings and structures in Plymouth County, Massachusetts
Hanover, Massachusetts
Tourist attractions in Plymouth County, Massachusetts
Hanover Mall